Abu Hubayra Amin ad deen al-Basri (Urdu ابو ہبیرہ امین الدین البصری )  was great Sufi of Chishti Order from Basra Iraq. He was disciple of Khwaja Sadid ad-Din Huzaifa al-Marashi and teacher of Khwaja Mumshad Uluw Al Dīnawarī
Abu Hubayra al-Basri is important link of chain of Chishti Order. At the age of seven he memorized Quran by heart and became mureed of Khwaja Sadid ad-Din Huzaifa al-Marashi at the age of thirty.

References

External links 
 Soofie (Sufi)

Chishtis
Iraqi Sufi saints
895 deaths